Sijerčić is a Bosnian surname. Notable people with the surname include:

Hedina Tahirović-Sijerčić (born 1960), Bosnian Gurbeti Romani journalist, broadcaster, writer, translator, linguistic researcher and teacher
Sanela Sijerčić (born 1976), Bosnian folk singer
Sinan Pasha Sijerčić (died 1806), Ottoman Bosnian general

Bosnian surnames
Bosniak families